The Bethlehem Bulldogs was a professional American football team,  based in Bethlehem, Pennsylvania, that played in the American Association from 1946 to 1950. 

The Bulldogs played in the league's Western Division through 1947, until the league dissolved its divisions.

In 1946, the Bulldogs finished in third place in the division, winning five games, losing four and tying one. In 1947, they finished in first place with an 8-1 record and beat the Paterson Panthers in the league's championship game 23-7.  In 1948, the Bulldogs went 4-5-1, finishing fifth in the league. They went 6-4 in 1949, finishing in third place and making the playoffs, which they lost. In 1950, they went 0-2.

The Bulldogs disbanded in mid-October 1950.

References

American football teams established in 1946
Defunct American football teams in Pennsylvania
American football teams disestablished in 1950
1946 establishments in Pennsylvania
1950 disestablishments in Pennsylvania
Sports in Bethlehem, Pennsylvania